Aquaporin-9 (AQP-9) is a protein that in humans is encoded by the AQP9 gene.

The aquaporins/major intrinsic protein are a family of water-selective membrane channels. Aquaporin-9 has greater sequence similarity with AQP3 and AQP7 and they may be a subfamily. Aquaporin-9 allows passage of a wide variety of noncharged solutes. AQP-9 stimulates urea transport and osmotic water permeability; there are contradicting reports about its role in providing glycerol permeability. Aquaporin-9 may also have some role in specialized leukocyte functions such as immunological response and bactericidal activity.

References

Further reading

External links